"Wondering" is a song by the band Dirty Pretty Things. It was released as a single on 25 September 2006 and was the third to be released from the band's debut album Waterloo to Anywhere. Early versions were generally titled "If You Were Wondering", the single-word title being settled upon for the final release of the album.

Single track listings

CD
 "Wondering"
 "No Signal. No Battery" (Demo)
 "The Gentry Cove" (Live)
 "Wondering" (Video)

7" (1)
 "Wondering"
 "Chinese Dogs" (Demo)

7" (2)
 "Wondering"
 "Last Of The Small Town Playboys" (Live At 02 Wireless Festival)

Chart performance

References

External links
Single info
Official Lyrics The Lyrics of the official Dirty Pretty Things website.

2006 singles
Dirty Pretty Things (band) songs
Song recordings produced by Dave Sardy
2006 songs
Songs written by Carl Barât
Mercury Records singles
Songs written by Anthony Rossomando